Los Cuates de Sinaloa are a Regional Mexican band that specializes in the Sierreño genre. They are led by cousins Gabriel and Nano Berrelleza, originally from La Vainilla, Sinaloa, Mexico, but currently based in Phoenix, Arizona, United States. The band signed to Sony BMG in 2006. Their 2006 album, Puro Sierreno Bravo, was number 13 in the Top Latin Albums. Their song "Negro y Azul" provided the opening music for the Breaking Bad episode "Negro y Azul", the song was a narcocorrido and performed as a Norteño_(music)'s Sierreño style, referencing the show's Neo-Western and New Mexico setting.

Charting albums
 Puro Sierreno Bravo – 6; April 14, 2007
 Mi Santito Preferido – 9; November 8, 2008
 Los Gallos Mas Caros – 10; September 22, 2007
 Puros Exitos Chacas – 11; April 19, 2008
 Pegando Con Tuba – 20; June 13, 2009
 Puro Cartel – 36; March 13, 2010
 Tocando With The Mafia – 41; April 30, 2011

References

Mexican musical groups